Spilosoma dubia, the dubious tiger moth, is a moth in the family Erebidae. It was described by Francis Walker in 1855. It is found from south-eastern Canada west to Alberta and in the eastern United States. The habitat consists of aspen parkland and southern boreal forests.

The wingspan is 32–38 mm. Adults are on wing from mid-May to mid-June.

The larvae have been recorded feeding on Prunus serotina.

References

Spilosoma dubia at BOLD
Spilosoma dubia at EOL
Spilosoma dubia at BHL

Moths described in 1855
dubia